Dick Doran (22 March 1868 – 5 December 1912) was an Australian rules footballer who played with South Melbourne in the Victorian Football League (VFL).

Notes

External links 

1868 births
1912 deaths
Australian rules footballers from Melbourne
Fremantle Football Club (1881–1899) players
Port Melbourne Football Club players
Sydney Swans players